Gustavia is the main town and capital of the island of Saint Barthélemy. Originally called Le Carénage, it was renamed in honor of King Gustav III of Sweden.

History
Saint Barthélemy was first claimed by France in 1648. The island was given to Sweden in exchange for trade rights in Gothenburg in 1784 and Sweden founded the Swedish West India Company. Prospering during the Napoleonic Wars, assets were low thereafter, and the island was sold back to France in 1878.

The eventual site of Gustavia was first called Le Carénage (The Careening) after the shelter it provided to damaged ships. According to the archives, the name Gustavia appeared between December 28, 1786, and February 9, 1787. Gustavia remains as a reflection of the Swedish period, during which a minority of the population of approximately 4% were of Swedish origin.

Three forts built in the mid- to late 17th century protected the harbour: Oscar (formerly Gustav Adolf), Karl and Gustav. There are two main churches in town, the Roman Catholic, Our Lady of the Assumption, built in 1829 and St Bartholomew's Anglican Church on the harbour front, which was built in 1855.

Gustavia's sister city is Piteå, located in Norrbotten, Sweden.

Amenities
The sites of Fort Karl, overlooking Shell Beach south of town, and Fort Gustav, at the base of the lighthouse to the north, are popular with hikers.  Fort Oscar, at the tip of Gustavia Peninsula, houses the Gendarmerie.  There is a museum at the end of Victor Schœlcher Road on the peninsula. Gustavia has a few restaurants serving American, Italian, French and other types of food. Gustavia has many high-end boutiques that are an essential source of revenue for the island, and one of the most high class luxury hotels on the island. There is a Royal Swedish Consulate at Gustavia (Consul Dantes Magras).

Climate
The climate is a tropical one with only minor variations in temperature. The island's small surface area of  allows it to take advantage of the smooth and pleasant blow of trade winds. This latter season sets in between May and November, and the ever-present sun is overcast by short passages of rainclouds with brief showers of 10 to 15 minutes. According to the Köppen Climate Classification system Gustavia has a tropical savanna climate, abbreviated Aw on climate maps.

Economy
The official currency of Saint Barthélemy is the euro.

Education
 École primaire Gustavia
 École maternelle Gustavia

Notable people
Eugénie Blanchard — the oldest verified person in the world at the time of her death. She spent most of her life in Gustavia.

Gallery

See also

 List of lighthouses in Saint Barthélemy

References

External links

 Government
Collectivity of Saint Barthélemy (Official government website) 
Comité Territorial du Tourisme (Tourism board website) 
Gustavia Harbor/Port de Gustavia (Official website) 
 General information
Saint Barthelemy. The World Factbook. Central Intelligence Agency.

 
Populated places in Saint Barthélemy
Quartiers of Saint Barthélemy
Capitals in the Caribbean
Populated places established in 1785
1785 establishments in North America
Gustav III